Baron Gerhard Louis De Geer of Finspång (usually known as Louis De Geer; 27 November 185425 February 1935) was a Swedish politician, who served in the first chamber of the Riksdag 1901–14, was governor of Kristianstad County 1905–23, and Prime Minister of Sweden for 121 days in 1920–1921.

Biography
Louis De Geer was born into a Swedish noble family on November 27, 1854, son of the former prime minister Louis Gerhard De Geer (1818–1896) and Countess Caroline Wachtmeister, daughter of Count Carl Axel Wachtmeister. He was born in Kristianstad in the province of Scania, Kristianstad County. After juridical studies at the University of Uppsala, he entered politics. He was a member of the first chamber as a representative of Kristianstad County 1901–14 and served as governor of that county 1905–23. De Geer was at first a moderate liberal, but became a member of the minority party in the first chamber. At the inception of the Liberal Coalition Party in 1912, he joined them. By 1914, he left that party, and becoming a political maverick. In the following years he was chairman of the committee that came up with the suggestion of an eight-hour work day in 1919, which strengthened his ties to the social democrats.

The sitting prime minister Hjalmar Branting had to resign after the election loss in 1920, but stalled the process just to block a right-wing government. The Head of State, King Gustav V, queried the party leaders about the conditions of the party-based parliament. The right-wing leaders protested, but the social democrats accepted the interim government appointed by the King.

The king called De Geer to the office of prime minister, in a coalition government of liberals and moderate conservatives. The government was to sit until the parliamentary elections in October 1921, the first elections with general voting rights.

Neither the left nor the right parties supported De Geer and his government. When a proposition on higher duty on coffee, by minister of finance Henric Tamm, was heavily voted down, Tamm put himself up for a vote of confidence, and was forced to resign office. Three days later, De Geer followed his resignation. De Geer's resignation came after the other ministers of the government had composed a joint letter of resignation, demanding the king to choose between them and the prime minister.

Person
In the early 1900s Louis De Geer was everything a politician should be: from a noble family and a high-ranking government official. His father had implemented the representationsreformen in 1865, and now he would hand over power to the parties after the first election with general voting rights.

Political beliefs
He strongly opposed any plans to keep the union between Sweden and Norway against the will of the Norwegian people. In the issue of voting rights, he joined the liberal party line and the demands for majority elections. He was a clear proponent of a strong army, unlike the liberal party leader Karl Staaff.

De Geer was of a reclusive and mild character. Neither the left nor the right felt compelled to support his government – on the contrary, both sides wanted to be able to portray the government as an enemy for the coming election.

See also
Swedish Prime Ministers

References

Bibliography 

 Books

 
 

1854 births
1935 deaths
People from Kristianstad Municipality
Members of the Första kammaren
Prime Ministers of Sweden
County governors of Sweden
Swedish nobility
Uppsala University alumni
Children of national leaders
Swedish people of Belgian descent